Delias ganymedes is a species of pierine butterfly endemic to the Philippines. It has been recorded from Mount Canlaon (Negros Island), Mount Madia-as (Panay Island) and Mount Halcon (Mindoro Island).

The wingspan is 55–60 mm.

Subspecies
Delias ganymedes ganymedes (Mt. Canlaon, Negros Island)
Delias ganymedes filarorum Nihira & Kawamura, 1987 (Mt. Madia-as, Panay Island)
Delias ganymedes halconensis Nakano & Yagishita, 1993 (Mt. Halcon, Mindoro Island)

References

ganymedes
Butterflies described in 1981